Model-based systems engineering (MBSE), according to the International Council on Systems Engineering (INCOSE), is the formalized application of modeling to support system requirements, design, analysis, verification and validation activities beginning in the conceptual design phase and continuing throughout development and later life cycle phases. MBSE is a technical approach to systems engineering that focuses on creating and exploiting domain models as the primary means of information exchange, rather than on document-based information exchange. MBSE technical approaches are commonly applied to a wide range of industries with complex systems, such as aerospace, defense, rail, automotive, manufacturing, etc.

History
The first known prominent public usage of the term "Model-Based Systems Engineering" is a book by A. Wayne Wymore with the same name. The MBSE term was also commonly used among the SysML Partners consortium during the formative years of their Systems Modeling Language (SysML) open source specification project during 2003-2005, so they could distinguish SysML from its parent language UML v2, where the latter was software-centric and associated with the term Model-Driven Development (MDD). The standardization of SysML in 2006 resulted in widespread modeling tool support for it and associated MBSE processes that emphasized SysML as their lingua franca. 

In September 2007, the MBSE approach was further generalized and popularized when INCOSE introduced its "MBSE 2020 Vision", which was not restricted to SysML, and supported other competitive modeling language standards, such as AP233, HLA, and Modelica.  According to the MBSE 2020 Vision: "MBSE is expected to replace the document-centric approach that has been practiced by systems engineers in the past and to influence the future practice of systems engineering by being fully integrated into the definition of systems engineering processes."

As of 2014, the scope of MBSE started to cover more Modeling and Simulation topics, in an attempt to bridge the gap between system model specifications and related system software simulations. As a consequence, the term "modeling and simulation-based systems engineering" has also been increasingly associated along with MBSE.

According to the INCOSE SEBoK (Systems Engineering Book of Knowledge) MBSE may be considered a "subset of digital engineering". INCOSE hosts an annual meeting on MBSE, as well as MBSE working groups.

See also 

 AUTOSAR (AUTomotive Open System ARchitecture)
 Engineering Information Management (EIM)
 Hardware-in-the-loop simulation
 List of requirements engineering tools
 List of SysML tools
 Model-based development (MBD)
 Model-driven development (MDD)
 Object Management Group
 OPM - Object Process Methodology (ISO/PAS 19450:2015)
 Systems engineering (SE)
 SysML - Systems Modeling Language
 UML - Unified Modeling Language

References

Further reading 
 Eclipse IDE Modeling Project: 
 Estefan, Jeff A. "Survey of model-based systems engineering (MBSE) methodologies." Incose MBSE Focus Group 25 (2007): 8.
 David Long, Zane Scott. A Primer for Model-Based Systems Engineering, 2011, Vitech Corporation.
 Patrice Micouin, Model Based Systems Engineering: Fundamentals and Methods, 2014.
 Ana Luísa Ramos, José Vasconcelos Ferreira and Jaume Barceló. "Model-based systems engineering: An emerging approach for modern systems." Systems, Man, and Cybernetics, Part C: Applications and Reviews, IEEE Transactions on 42.1 (2012): 101-111.
 A. Wayne Wymore, Model-Based Systems Engineering, 1993.
 Pascal Roques. MBSE with the ARCADIA Method and the Capella Tool - 8th European Congress on Embedded Real Time Software and Systems (ERTS 2016).
 Jean-Luc Voirin, Model-based System and Architecture Engineering with the ARCADIA Method, 388 pages, ISTE Press - Elsevier 2017, ISBN: 9781785481697
 Somers, James. "The Coming Software Apocalypse," The Atlantic Magazine, 2017.
 Casteran, Regis. "Functions in systems model.", Medium article, 2019.
 Knizhnik et al. "An Exploration of Lessons Learned from NASA's MBSE Infusion and Modernization Initiative (MIAMI)", NASA Systems Engineering, 2020.
 Meillier, Renaud. "System Simulation in the Context of MBSE", Siemens article 2021.

External Links 

 An Introduction to MBSE - SEI Blog
 Model Based Systems Engineering (MBSE) - NASA 

Systems engineering
Unified Modeling Language